Gudrun Anette Høie (born 13 July 1970) is a Norwegian sport wrestler from Kristiansund.

She won a gold medal in the FILA Wrestling World Championships in 1989, 1990, 1993 and 1998, a silver medal in 1991, and bronze in 1999. She was European champion in sumo wrestling in 1998. She has won the National Championships nine times.

She became known in Norway, when she, as the first in Norway, was suspended from her sport for not having revealed her whereabouts to the national anti-doping agency. The suspension lasted from April to November 2007, and destroyed her form for the 2008 Summer Olympics.

Outside of sport, she works as a physician in Kristiansund. She represented the club Kristiansund AK.

References

1970 births
Living people
Norwegian female sport wrestlers
Sportspeople from Kristiansund
Doping cases in wrestling
Norwegian sportspeople in doping cases
World Wrestling Championships medalists
World Wrestling Champions
20th-century Norwegian women
21st-century Norwegian women